Pat Thomas (born 5 May 1950) was a Light-middleweight boxer, originally from Saint Kitts and Nevis, who took British citizenship and won two British boxing titles in the 1970s and 80s. After leaving Saint Kitts, Thomas settled in Cardiff in Wales, and is recognised as a Welsh fighter taking the Welsh light middleweight Championship in 1977.

Boxing career
Thomas' first professional bout was at welterweight, fought in Manchester against Ray Farell, himself a fairly novice boxer with only two professional matches to his name. Thomas won by knockout in the second round, and this started a nine match unbeaten run, though none of his seven wins after Farell coming through knockout. His first defeat was a points decision to Alan Reid at the end of 1971, a fighter who he had faced and beaten six months earlier.

Thomas' next bout was in 1972, against Jimmy Fairweather in Walworth, saw Thomas now fighting in eight-round matches. A win over Fairweather was followed by victories over Mickey Flynn and Phil Dykes, before being disqualified in an encounter with Charlie Cooper. At the start of 1973, he beat Des Rea, the Irish Welterweight Champion by a points decision; this was followed by two more wins before he faced Rea again, this time beating him by technical knockout in the fourth round. 1973 ended just like the previous two years, with a defeat, a narrow points loss to Trevor Francis at Sophia Gardens in Cardiff. The next year saw Thomas begin one of the most successful periods of his career, going on a twelve match unbeaten run. On 15 December 1975, Thomas faced Pat MacCormack for the vacant British Welterweight title. He knocked MacCormack down twice, before winning by knockout in the thirteenth and in the process became the first immigrant fighter to win the British Welterweight title.

After a win over Jim Devanny in February 1976, Thomas fought Italian Marco Scano in Cagliari, for the vacant European Welterweight title. Thomas was outclassed losing by knockout in the second round. This was followed by Thomas' second overseas match, facing Jørgen Hansen in Denmark; Thomas lost by technical knockout in the third. Back in Britain, Thomas successfully defended his welterweight title against Trevor Francis, but then lost the belt when he was knocked out by Henry Rhiney in Luton.

After losing the welterweight title, Thomas went up a weight division, now fighting at light-middleweight. He began in the new division by taking the Welsh Light-middleweight title from Dave Davies, who had beaten Thomas three times in the amateurs, in early 1977. Despite the encounter being for a Welsh title, the match took place at The Stadium in Liverpool, the fight being part of the undercard for John Conteh's WBC World Championship bout with Len Hutchins. Thomas' light-middleweight career was far more chequered than his time as a welterweight, losing to Larry Paul, before beating Rhiney and then drawing with Tony Sibson. In 1978 Thomas spent much of his time fighting outside Britain, but with little success. He fought twice in Netherlands, a win and a loss, which were followed by three straight loses, against former Olympic Lightweight Champion Chris Clarke in Canada, then French Champion Claude Martin and finally Spanish fighter Andoni Amana in Bilbao.

His fortunes changed on British soil, with wins over Salvo Nucifero and Robbie Davies, before losing to Kenny Bristol in a fight for the vacant British Empire Light-middleweight title by a unanimous points decision. The very next fight was another title decider, this time for the British Light-middleweight belt on 11 September 1979. In that encounter he beat Jimmy Batten in the ninth round to take his second British title; though Batten later stated that he felt he had given the title away as he wasn't in the correct frame of mind due to personal problems. Thomas defended his title successfully twice, knocking out Dave Proud in the seventh and then stopping Steve Hopkin in the final round with a badly cut eye. His third defence ended in defeat, losing to Hensol Graham by points. This was the start of a six-round losing streak that only ended with his retirement from boxing in 1984.

Professional boxing record

|-
|align="center" colspan=8|35 Wins (14 knockouts, 21 decisions), 18 Losses (4 knockouts, 14 decisions), 3 Draws, 1 No Contest 
|-
| align="center" style="border-style: none none solid solid; background: #e3e3e3"|Result
| align="center" style="border-style: none none solid solid; background: #e3e3e3"|Record
| align="center" style="border-style: none none solid solid; background: #e3e3e3"|Opponent
| align="center" style="border-style: none none solid solid; background: #e3e3e3"|Type
| align="center" style="border-style: none none solid solid; background: #e3e3e3"|Round
| align="center" style="border-style: none none solid solid; background: #e3e3e3"|Date
| align="center" style="border-style: none none solid solid; background: #e3e3e3"|Location
| align="center" style="border-style: none none solid solid; background: #e3e3e3"|Notes
|-align=center
|Loss
|
|align=left| Chris Pyatt
|PTS
|10
|15 Mar 1984
|align=left| Granby Halls, Leicester, Leicestershire, United Kingdom
|align=left|
|-
|Loss
|
|align=left| Graeme Ahmed
|PTS
|10
|31 Aug 1982
|align=left| Buddy's Night Club, South Shields, United Kingdom
|align=left|
|-
|Loss
|
|align=left| Brian Anderson
|PTS
|10
|21 May 1982
|align=left| Crucible Theatre, Sheffield, United Kingdom
|align=left|
|-
|Loss
|
|align=left| Darwin Brewster
|PTS
|10
|26 Apr 1982
|align=left| STAR Centre, Cardiff, Wales, United Kingdom
|align=left|
|-
|Loss
|
|align=left| Nino La Rocca
|TKO
|4
|13 Nov 1981
|align=left| Rome, Italy
|align=left|
|-
|Loss
|
|align=left| Herol Graham
|PTS
|15
|24 Mar 1981
|align=left| Sheffield City Hall, Sheffield, United Kingdom
|align=left|
|-
|Win
|
|align=left| Steve Hopkin
|TKO
|15
|16 Sep 1980
|align=left| Wembley Conference Centre, Wembley, London, United Kingdom
|align=left|
|-
|Win
|
|align=left| "Fighting" Jim Richards
|PTS
|8
|3 Jun 1980
|align=left| Royal Albert Hall, Kensington, London, United Kingdom
|align=left|
|-
|Win
|
|align=left| Dave Proud
|KO
|7
|11 Dec 1979
|align=left| Bletchley Leisure Centre, Milton Keynes, United Kingdom
|align=left|
|-
|Win
|
|align=left| Jimmy Batten
|TKO
|9
|11 Sep 1979
|align=left| Wembley Conference Centre, Wembley, London, United Kingdom
|align=left|
|-
|Loss
|
|align=left| Kenny Bristol
|UD
|15
|29 Jul 1979
|align=left| National Sports Hall, Georgetown, Guyana
|align=left|
|-
|Win
|
|align=left| Robbie Davies
|PTS
|12
|5 Apr 1979
|align=left| Liverpool Stadium, Liverpool, Merseyside, United Kingdom
|align=left|
|-
|Win
|
|align=left| Salvo Nucifero
|TKO
|1
|27 Nov 1978
|align=left| Civic Sports Centre, Kettering, Northamptonshire, United Kingdom
|align=left|
|-
|Loss
|
|align=left| Andoni Amana
|PTS
|10
|5 Oct 1978
|align=left| Bilbao, Spain
|align=left|
|-
|Loss
|
|align=left| Claude "General" Martin
|PTS
|10
|23 Sep 1978
|align=left| Saint-Malo, France
|align=left|
|-
|Loss
|
|align=left| Chris Clarke
|UD
|8
|1 Aug 1978
|align=left| Halifax Metro Centre, Halifax, Nova Scotia, Canada
|align=left|
|-
|Win
|
|align=left| Agamil Yilderim
|PTS
|8
|29 May 1978
|align=left| Rotterdam Ahoy Sportpaleis, Rotterdam, Netherlands
|align=left|
|-
|Loss
|
|align=left| Marijan Benes
|PTS
|8
|16 Jan 1978
|align=left| Rotterdam, Netherlands
|align=left|
|-
|Draw
|
|align=left| Tony Sibson
|PTS
|8
|18 Oct 1977
|align=left| Wolverhampton Civic Hall, Wolverhampton, United Kingdom
|align=left|
|-
|Win
|
|align=left| Henry Rhiney
|PTS
|8
|14 Jun 1977
|align=left| Empire Pool, Wembley, London, United Kingdom
|align=left|
|-
|Loss
|
|align=left| Larry Paul
|DQ
|5
|27 May 1977
|align=left| Digbeth Institute, Birmingham, West Midlands, United Kingdom
|align=left|
|-
|Win
|
|align=left| "Boxing" Dave Davies
|TKO
|8
|5 Mar 1977
|align=left| Liverpool Stadium, Liverpool, Merseyside, United Kingdom
|align=left|
|-
|Loss
|
|align=left| Henry Rhiney
|TKO
|8
|7 Dec 1976
|align=left| Luton Caesar's Palace, Luton, United Kingdom
|align=left|
|-
|Win
|
|align=left| "Boxing" Trevor Francis
|PTS
|15
|22 Sep 1976
|align=left| Hilton Hotel, Mayfair, London, United Kingdom
|align=left|
|-
|Loss
|
|align=left| Jørgen Hansen
|TKO
|3
|3 Jun 1976
|align=left| K.B. Hallen, Copenhagen, Denmark
|align=left|
|-
|Loss
|
|align=left| Marco Scano
|KO
|2
|9 Apr 1976
|align=left| Palazzo Dello Sport, Cagliari, Italy
|align=left|
|-
|Win
|
|align=left| Jim Devanney
|TKO
|8
|16 Feb 1976
|align=left| Arden Sporting Club, Birmingham, West Midlands, United Kingdom
|align=left|
|-
|Win
|
|align=left| Pat McCormack
|KO
|13
|15 Dec 1975
|align=left| Manor Place Baths, Walworth, London, United Kingdom
|align=left|
|-
|Win
|
|align=left| Peter Scheibner
|PTS
|8
|8 Jul 1975
|align=left| Double Diamond Club, Caerphilly, United Kingdom
|align=left|
|-
|Win
|
|align=left| Jeff Gale
|TKO
|11
|2 Jun 1975
|align=left| National Sporting Club, Piccadilly, London, United Kingdom
|align=left|
|-
|Win
|
|align=left| Jim Montague
|KO
|5
|28 Apr 1975
|align=left| Albany Hotel, Glasgow, United Kingdom
|align=left|
|-
|Win
|
|align=left| Henry Rhiney
|PTS
|8
|4 Dec 1974
|align=left| National Sporting Club, Piccadilly, London, United Kingdom
|align=left|
|-
|Draw
|
|align=left| Kenny Webber
|PTS
|10
|25 Sep 1974
|align=left| Midland Sporting Club, Solihull, West Midlands, United Kingdom
|align=left|
|-
|Win
|
|align=left| Henry Rhiney
|PTS
|8
|25 Jun 1974
|align=left| National Sporting Club, Piccadilly, London, United Kingdom
|align=left|
|-
|Win
|
|align=left| Mickey Flynn
|PTS
|8
|22 Apr 1974
|align=left| National Sporting Club, Piccadilly, London, United Kingdom
|align=left|
|-
|Win
|
|align=left| "Scottish" John Smith
|PTS
|8
|18 Mar 1974
|align=left| National Sporting Club, Piccadilly, London, United Kingdom
|align=left|
|-
|Win
|
|align=left| Des Rea
|TKO
|4
|27 Feb 1974
|align=left| Sophia Gardens, Cardiff, Wales, United Kingdom
|align=left|
|-
|Win
|
|align=left| Les Pearson
|KO
|1
|21 Jan 1974
|align=left| National Sporting Club, Piccadilly, London, United Kingdom
|align=left|
|-
|Loss
|
|align=left| "Boxing" Trevor Francis
|PTS
|8
|21 Nov 1973
|align=left| Sophia Gardens, Cardiff, Wales, United Kingdom
|align=left|
|-
|Win
|
|align=left| Des Rea
|TKO
|4
|5 Oct 1973
|align=left| Sophia Gardens, Cardiff, Wales, United Kingdom
|align=left|
|-
|Win
|
|align=left| Les Pearson
|PTS
|8
|26 Sep 1973
|align=left| Midland Sporting Club, Solihull, West Midlands, United Kingdom
|align=left|
|-
|Win
|
|align=left| Amos Talbot
|PTS
|8
|12 Mar 1973
|align=left| Anglo-Welsh Sporting Club, Caerphilly, United Kingdom
|align=left|
|-
|Win
|
|align=left| Des Rea
|PTS
|8
|15 Jan 1973
|align=left| Double Diamond Club, Caerphilly, United Kingdom
|align=left|
|-
|Loss
|
|align=left| Charlie Cooper
|DQ
|7
|22 Nov 1972
|align=left| Cliffs Pavilion, Southend, United Kingdom
|align=left|
|-
|Win
|
|align=left| Phil Dykes
|TKO
|3
|19 Sep 1972
|align=left| King's Hall, Manchester, United Kingdom
|align=left|
|-
|Win
|
|align=left| Mickey Flynn
|PTS
|8
|15 May 1972
|align=left| Mayfair Sporting Club, Mayfair, London, United Kingdom
|align=left|
|-
|Win
|
|align=left| Jimmy Fairweather
|PTS
|8
|20 Apr 1972
|align=left| Manor Place Baths, Walworth, London, United Kingdom
|align=left|
|-
|Loss
|
|align=left| "Boxing" Alan Reid
|PTS
|6
|11 Oct 1971
|align=left| Manchester, United Kingdom
|align=left|
|-
|Win
|
|align=left| Johnny Shields
|PTS
|6
|17 May 1971
|align=left| Hotel Piccadilly, Manchester, United Kingdom
|align=left|
|-
|Win
|
|align=left| Tony Bagshaw
|PTS
|6
|3 May 1971
|align=left| Cleethorpes, Lincolnshire, United Kingdom
|align=left|
|-
|Draw
|
|align=left| Mohammed Ellah
|PTS
|6
|20 Apr 1971
|align=left| Newport, Monmouthshire, United Kingdom
|align=left|
|-
|Win
|
|align=left| "Boxing" Alan Reid
|PTS
|6
|29 Mar 1971
|align=left| Manchester, United Kingdom
|align=left|
|-
|Win
|
|align=left| Tony Burnett
|DQ
|4
|23 Mar 1971
|align=left| Newport, Monmouthshire, United Kingdom
|align=left|
|-
|No Contest
|
|align=left| Tony Bagshaw
|NC
|4
|22 Feb 1971
|align=left| Manchester, United Kingdom
|align=left|
|-
|Win
|
|align=left| Mohammed Ellah
|PTS
|6
|9 Feb 1971
|align=left| Newport, Monmouthshire, United Kingdom
|align=left|
|-
|Win
|
|align=left| "Boxing" Keith White
|PTS
|6
|12 Jan 1971
|align=left| Shoreditch Town Hall, Shoreditch, London, United Kingdom
|align=left|
|-
|Win
|
|align=left| Ray "The Dart" Farrell
|KO
|2
|14 Dec 1970
|align=left| Manchester, United Kingdom
|align=left|
|}

See also
 List of British welterweight boxing champions

References

External links
 

Welsh male boxers
Saint Kitts and Nevis male boxers
Light-middleweight boxers
Welterweight boxers
1950 births
Living people
Saint Kitts and Nevis emigrants to the United Kingdom